Francis Xavier Archibald (October 2, 1931 – June 24, 2021) was an American politician in the state of South Carolina. He served in the South Carolina House of Representatives as a member of the Democratic Party from 1981 to 1986, representing Berkeley County, South Carolina. He was a security consultant and columnist.

References

1931 births
2021 deaths
Democratic Party members of the South Carolina House of Representatives
People from Lexington, Massachusetts